Sergio Luis Maciel Lucas, aka Serjão (born 18 September 1979), is a Brazilian born, Azerbaijani futsal player who plays for Uragan Ivano-Frankovsk and the Azerbaijan national futsal team.

References

External links 
 UEFA profile

1979 births
Living people
Azerbaijani men's futsal players
Futsal forwards
Uragan Ivano-Frankivsk players